The Hot, the Cool, & the Vicious is a 1976 kung fu film starring Dorian Tan Tao-liang, Wong Tao, and Tommy Lee.

Plot
Black Stone is a quiet sleepy town until a mysterious stranger arrives. Secretive of his business he soon arouses suspicion especially when his identity is revealed as the infamous, troublemaking 'Southern Fist' fighter Pai Yu Ching. Tan Tao Liang plays 'Northern Leg' Captain Lu, the towns 'sheriff' who finds himself in deep water when the mayor's son murders his (Capt Lu's) mother-in-law. Lu is steadfast in his resolve to catch the killer but has many obstacles put in his way, particularly Ms. Li (Suen Ga Lam); the sister of an ex-sheriff who Lu accidentally killed and wants revenge, and the mayor, who hires Pai Yu Ching to protect his house from any would-be lawmen that might try to arrest his son. The mayor has other reasons for keeping Lu at arm's length as he is deeply involved in a counterfeiting ring. Pai Yu Ching is actually a secret government official, who in the beginning is often in staring contests with Capt Lu but eventually seeks Lu's help after his partner is killed by the hotels owner (who is secretly in cahoots with the Mayor).
When matters get out of hand the mayor calls on his partner, the strange Mr Lung (Tommy Lee), for help. Mr Lung is a kind of golden haired, white faced gorilla-like creature that speaks in an echoed voice and walks with a limp. He is, however, extremely competent at mantis kung fu. Mr. Lung eventually helps the mayor capture Capt Lu and Pai Yu Ching after they find the seal that makes counterfeit money. Ms. Li puts aside her hatred for Capt Lu and rescues him a Pai and kills the mayor. Capt Lu and Pai Yu Ching then hunt down Mr. Lung for a final showdown.

Cast
 Dorian Tan Tao-liang as Capt Lu
 Wong Tao as Pai Yu Ching
 Tommy Lee as Mr. Lung
 Suen Ga Lam as Ms. Li
 George Wang as The Mayor
 Phillip Ko as Lung Fong

External links
 
 Top Classic Kung Fu Movie List of all time at KungFuMovieMadness.com]

Kung fu films
Hong Kong martial arts films
1970s Hong Kong films